WLBW is a radio station in the Fenwick Island / Ocean City area of Delaware and Maryland and broadcasting at 92.1 MHz. The station plays a contemporary Christian music format as part of the K-Love network. The station is owned by the Educational Media Foundation.

History
HVS Partners acquired the construction permit for WADD before it went to air, changed the call letters to WLBW, and signed the station on with an oldies format known as "The Wave" on April 1, 1994, simulcasting WLVW-FM in Salisbury, Maryland. The move allowed WLVW's oldies format to expand its reach. HVS Partners sold its stations in the Ocean City-Salisbury market to Cumulus Broadcasting in 1997—including WLBW, three additional FM outlets and an AM station—in a $9.2 million transaction; earlier in the year, Cumulus had entered into a local marketing agreement to run them.

Clear Channel Communications acquired WLBW, WLVW-FM, and the other Cumulus Ocean City stations in 2000, amid financial problems at Cumulus. Clear Channel would flip WLVW-FM to contemporary hit radio in 2004 as WDKZ, breaking the two-station simulcast, with WLBW retaining the oldies format. After a private equity buyout by Bain Capital in 2007, Clear Channel was required to spin off stations from a series of grandfathered clusters, including the Salisbury–Ocean City market, due to ownership limits; it chose to place WLBW and WDKZ in the Aloha Station Trust. The trust sold both stations to EMF in November 2010 for $400,000.

References

External links

K-Love radio stations
Radio stations established in 1994
1994 establishments in Delaware
Educational Media Foundation radio stations
LBW